Rev. Canon. James Edgar Sheppard  (10 August 1845 – 30 August 1921) was a Canon of Windsor from 1907 to 1921.

Early life and education
Sheppard was born in 1845 in Worcester, the son of Dr Edgar Sheppard, Professor of Psychology at King's College, London, and his wife, Anabel Marmont Sheppard.

He was educated at St John's College, Oxford and graduated in 1873.

Career

He was appointed:
Minor Canon of Windsor 1878 – 1884
Priest in ordinary to Queen Victoria 1882 – 1884
Sub Dean of the Chapels Royal and Chaplain to the Household at St James Palace. 1884
Chaplain to the Duchess of Cambridge 1885 – 1889
Hon. Chaplain to Queen Victoria 1886 – 1900; to the Duke of Cambridge 1889 – 1904, and to King Edward VII 1901 – 1909
Permanent Reader and Chaplain of the Chapel Royal, Whitehall 1886
Chaplain, Order of St John of Jerusalem 1894
Deputy Clerk of the Closet 1903 – 1910
Sub Almoner 1910
Domestic Chaplain to King George V and Queen Alexandra 1910

As Sub-Dean of the Chapel Royal to King Edward VII, he took part in the Coronation of King Edward VII and Queen Alexandra on 9 August 1902, and was invested as a Commander of the Royal Victorian Order (CVO) two days after the ceremony, on 11 August 1902.

He was appointed to the ninth stall in St George's Chapel, Windsor Castle in 1907, a position he held until 1921. He was awarded KCVO in the 1914 Birthday Honours.

Personal life

He married Mary Peters White, daughter of Richard White of Instow, in 1874, and they had three sons and one daughter. Their eldest son was Edgar Sheppard (b. 26 Jun 1878), served as a Lieutenant and finally a Captain in the 19th Q A O R (Queen Alexandra's Own Royal) Hussars Cavalry. Their second son was Arthur Montagu Sheppard (1879–1882). Their youngest son was Dick Sheppard (1880–1937), who followed his father into the church. Their daughter was Margaret Mary Sheppard (b. circa 1877)

References 

1845 births
1921 deaths
Clergy from Worcester, England
Canons of Windsor
Alumni of St John's College, Oxford
Knights Commander of the Royal Victorian Order